Senator Crain may refer to:

Brian Crain (born 1961), Oklahoma State Senate
William H. Crain (1848–1896), Texas State Senate